Lim Hwee Hua ( Tan; ; born 26 February 1959) is a Singaporean former politician who served as Minister in the Prime Minister's Office, Second Minister for Finance and Second Minister for Transport concurrently between 2009 and 2011. A former member of the governing People's Action Party (PAP), she was the Member of Parliament (MP) representing the Serangoon division of Aljunied GRC between 2006 and 2011, and Marine Parade GRC between 1996 and 2006. She was the first female Cabinet minister in the country's history. 

Lim had served as Deputy Speaker of Parliament between 2002 and 2004, Senior Minister of State for Finance and Senior Minister of State for Transport concurrently between 2008 and 2009, and Minister of State for Finance and Minister of State for Transport concurrently between 2004 and 2008.

Early life and career
Lim was educated at Raffles Institution, before graduating from Girton College at the University of Cambridge in 1981, majoring in mathematics and engineering, under the Overseas Merit Scholarship.

She subsequently went on to complete a Master of Business Administration degree in finance at Anderson School of Management at the University of California, Los Angeles in 1989.

Lim began her career as an administrative officer in the Ministry of Finance (MOF), Ministry of Education (MOE) and the Ministry of Law (MinLaw). 

In 1989, she joined Swiss Bank Corporation as an investment analyst before moving on to Jardine Fleming in 1992, where she served as Head of Research and Director of Business Development. 

In 2000, she joined Temasek Holdings as Managing Director of Corporate Stewardship and later, Managing Director of Strategic Relations. While she was at Temasek Holdings, she sat on boards including Port of Singapore Authority, Keppel Corporation and Mapletree.

Political career
Lim was elected as a Member of Parliament (MP) for Marine Parade GRC at both 1997 general election and the 2001 general election. From 1 April 2002 to 11 August 2004, she was the Deputy Speaker of Parliament and Chairman of the Public Accounts Committee. Lim was appointed the Minister of State for Finance and Transport on 12 August 2004.

At the 2006 general election, Lim contested in Aljunied GRC and was elected along with George Yeo, Cynthia Phua, Yeo Guat Kwang and Zainul Abidin Bin Mohamed Rasheed. She was promoted to Senior Minister of State for Finance and Transport on 1 April 2008.

On 1 April 2009, Lim become the first woman to serve in Singapore's Cabinet when she was made a Minister in the Prime Minister's Office, Second Minister for Finance and Second Minister for Transport.

Between 2002 and 2011, Lim was a member of the Central Executive Committee of the PAP, and the Chairman of the party's Women's Wing. She was inducted into the Singapore Council of Women's Organisation (SCWO) Hall of Fame on 31 March 2010, and she received the Her World Woman of the Year Award on 23 April 2010.

Lim contested the 2011 general election in Aljunied GRC, but her team (led by George Yeo) was defeated by the team fielded by the Workers' Party (WP) led by its Secretary-General Low Thia Khiang. She subsequently stepped down from the Central Executive Committee of the PAP, and announced that she was retiring from politics and would not be contesting the next general election, saying she was surprised by the depth of resentment felt by citizens towards the government.

Post-political career
Following her retirement from politics, Lim was appointed Non-Executive Director at Jardine Cycle & Carriage in July 2011. In October 2011, Lim was appointed as a senior advisor at Kohlberg Kravis Roberts. In November 2011, Lim was appointed Independent Non-Executive Director on the Global Advisory Council at Ernst & Young. 

She had also served as Honorary Chairman of the Securities Investors Association Singapore between 2013 and 2017.

She published a book, Government In Business: Friend Or Foe?, with the Straits Times Press in 2013.

Personal life
Lim grew up in family of nine children in Tiong Bahru. Her father was a tea merchant. Lim is married to Andy Lim, a partner and founder of Tembusu Partners, a private equity firm. They have a son and two daughters.

References

External links

Parliament of Singapore CVs of MPs

1959 births
Living people
Members of the Cabinet of Singapore
Members of the Parliament of Singapore
People's Action Party politicians
Singaporean people of Chinese descent
Singaporean people of Teochew descent
Alumni of Girton College, Cambridge
Raffles Institution alumni
Women government ministers of Singapore
Singaporean women in politics
Government ministers of Singapore
Women legislative deputy speakers